The Chief of Chaplains of the United States Navy (CHC) is the highest-ranking military chaplain in the United States Navy and head of the United States Navy Chaplain Corps. As part of the Office of the Chief of Naval Operations and Department of the Navy, the CHC is dual-hatted as the Director of Religious Ministries (N097) under OPNAV. In these capacities, the CHC is the principal advisor to the secretary of the Navy, the chief of naval operations and, where appropriate, the commandant of the Marine Corps and commandant of the Coast Guard "on all matters pertaining to religion within the Navy, United States Marine Corps, and United States Coast Guard." For administrative and personnel matters, the CHC reports to the chief of naval personnel.

The position was created in 1917 to "provide a system of appointing qualified and professional chaplains that meet the needs of the Navy". The nominee, as decided by the president of the United States, must be an active-duty officer of the Chaplain Corps above the rank of commander who has served in the Corps for at least eight years. The CHC serves for a 4-year term, but the president may terminate or extend the appointment at his pleasure. By statute, the officeholder holds the two-star rank of rear admiral while serving as Chief.

The current CHC is Rear Admiral Gregory N. Todd, a Lutheran, who assumed office on May 16, 2022.

List of officeholders

Chief of Chaplains hallway

A hallway to honor former Chiefs of Navy Chaplain Corps was dedicated at the Navy Annex, in Arlington, Va., in 2004. Five former Chiefs of Chaplains were present at the dedication ceremony, including Barry C. Black, Alvin B. Koeneman, Neil M. Stevenson, Ross H. Trower, and David F. White.

See also
Armed Forces Chaplains Board
Deputy Chief of Chaplains of the United States Navy
Chaplain of the Coast Guard
Chaplain of the United States Marine Corps
Chiefs of Chaplains of the United States
International Military Chiefs of Chaplains Conference

References

United States Navy Chief